Kashmir Solidarity Day or Kashmir Day is a national holiday observed in Pakistan on 5 February annually. It is observed to show Pakistan's support and unity with the people of Indian-administered Jammu and Kashmir and Kashmiri separatists' efforts to secede from India, and to pay homage to the Kashmiris who have died in the conflict. Solidarity rallies are held in the Pakistani-administered territory of Azad Jammu and Kashmir,
Pakistan and by Mirpuri Kashmiris in the United Kingdom.

Kashmir Day was first proposed by Qazi Hussain Ahmad of the Jamaat-e-Islami Pakistan in 1990, and supported by Nawaz Sharif. The current commemoration was started by the Pakistani minister for Kashmir Affairs and Northern Areas in 2004.

History 
Kashmir Day was first proposed by Qazi Hussain Ahmad of the Jamaat-e-Islami Pakistan in 1990. In 1991, the then-Prime Minister of Pakistan Nawaz Sharif called for a "Kashmir Solidarity Day Strike". Sharif had come to power with the help of the Jamaat in the previous year, and the 1991 event was also a Jamaat affair.

The current 'Kashmir Solidarity Day' was started by the Pakistani minister for Kashmir Affairs and Northern Areas in 2004.

The 2007 event was organized by Jamaat-ud-dawa, the religious charity associated with the banned Islamist terrorist organization Lashkar-e-Taiba. The solidarity rally was addressed by Hafiz Saeed, the chief of Lashkar-e-Taiba.

In 2021, the New York State Assembly passed a resolution calling on the Governor of New York to recognize the day as Kashmir American Day. According to the resolution, the day is meant to recognize New York's Kashmiri community and to "champion human rights including the freedom of religion".

In 2022, the residents in several towns of Pakistan-administered Azad Kashmir called it a "Fraud Day", and criticised the government for poor infrastructure as compared to Indian-administered Kashmir.
Also in 2022, the Pakistani franchises of international companies such as Hyundai and Kia Motors, Suzuki Motors, Toyota, KFC, Pizza Hut, etc. issued advertisements in favour of Kashmiris 'right to freedom'. Their parent international companies apologised for the partisan nature of the acts and said that their names were used without authorisation.

See also 

 All Parties Hurriyat Conference
 Human rights abuses in Jammu and Kashmir

Notes

References

External links
 
Nation to observe Kashmir Day today, Pakistan Today, 4 February 2015.

Kashmir conflict
Public holidays in Pakistan
Nawaz Sharif administration
Azad Kashmir
Culture of Jammu and Kashmir
February observances